Park Hyun-sook (17 October 1896 – 30 January 1981) was a South Korean independence activist and politician. In 1946 she was one of the four women who were appointed to the Interim Legislative Assembly, becoming South Korea's first female legislators. She later served in the National Assembly.

Biography
Born in Seoul in 1896, Park was educated at Soongeui Girl's High School in Pyongyang.

Following the end of World War II, the United States Army Military Government established an Interim Legislative Assembly with 90 members; 45 elected and 45 appointed by Military Governor John R. Hodge. She was later elected to the National Assembly as a representative of the Liberal Party in 1958. She lost her seat in the 1960 elections, but in the 1963 elections she was elected as a representative of the Democratic Republican Party.

She died in January 1981.

References

1896 births
Korean independence activists
20th-century South Korean women politicians
20th-century South Korean politicians
Members of the Interim Legislative Assembly
Members of the National Assembly (South Korea)
Liberal Party (South Korea) politicians
Democratic Republican Party (South Korea) politicians
1981 deaths
Female members of the National Assembly (South Korea)